Big City Sounds is an album by The Jazztet, led by trumpeter Art Farmer and saxophonist Benny Golson, featuring performances recorded in 1960 and originally released on the Argo label.

Music
"The Cool One" is a medium tempo piece by Golson that was intended to be a commercial success, as "Killer Joe" had been on the Jazztet's previous album, Meet the Jazztet. "Blues on Down" is also by Golson, and was originally performed for his album The Modern Touch. Golson added 16 written bars to the version of "Hi-Fly" recorded for Big City Sounds, which is faster than usual. Farmer is the main feature on the jazz standard "My Funny Valentine". "Wonder Why" has "a 36-bar, AABA'C form". The Latin "Con Alma" also contains material added by Golson. "Lament" is a feature for trombonist Tom McIntosh, while "Bean Bag" features pianist Cedar Walton. The final track, "Five Spot After Dark", is a blues written by Golson when playing at New York's Five Spot.

Reception
The Allmusic review awarded the album 3 stars.

Track listing
All compositions by Benny Golson except as indicated
 "The Cool One" – 3:02  
 "Blues on Down" – 6:03    
 "Hi-Fly" (Randy Weston) – 5:50   
 "My Funny Valentine" (Lorenz Hart, Richard Rodgers) – 4:33   
 "Wonder Why" (Sammy Cahn) – 5:54   
 "Con Alma" (Dizzy Gillespie) – 5:00
 "Lament" (J. J. Johnson) – 3:31
 "Bean Bag" – 4:53    
 "Five Spot After Dark" – 3:18

Personnel
Art Farmer – trumpet
Benny Golson – tenor saxophone
Tom McIntosh – trombone 
Cedar Walton – piano
Tommy Williams – bass
Albert Heath – drums

References 

Argo Records albums
Benny Golson albums
1960 albums
Art Farmer albums